Lunania is a genus of flowering plants in the family Salicaceae.

Selected species
 Lunania cubensis Turczaninov
 Lunania dodecandra Wright
 Lunania elongata Britton & P.Wilson
 Lunania polydactyla Urban
 Lunania racemosa Hook.

References

 
Salicaceae genera
Taxonomy articles created by Polbot